Merle Haggard's Christmas Present is the eighteenth studio album by American country singer Merle Haggard backed by The Strangers, released in 1973. The single, "If We Make It Through December" spent four weeks at No. 1 on the Billboard magazine Hot Country Singles chart in December 1973 and January 1974, and cracked the Top 30 of the Billboard Hot 100. "If We Make It Through December" was the No. 2 song of the year on Billboard's Hot Country Singles 1974 year-end chart. 

The original LP release of the album carries the subtitle Something Old, Something New.

Track listing 
All songs by Merle Haggard unless otherwise noted.
 "If We Make It Through December" – 2:42
 "Santa Claus and Popcorn" – 2:13
 "Bobby Wants a Puppy Dog for Christmas" – 2:13
 "Daddy Won't Be Home Again for Christmas" – 3:04
 "Grandma's Homemade Christmas Card" – 1:50
 "White Christmas" (Irving Berlin) – 2:28
 "Silver Bells" (Jay Livingston, Ray Evans) – 3:20
 "Winter Wonderland" (Felix Bernard, Richard B. Smith) – 2:31
 "Silent Night" (Josef Mohr, Franz Xaver Gruber) – 2:29
 "Jingle Bells" (James Lord Pierpont) – 2:21

Chart positions

References 

1973 Christmas albums
Merle Haggard albums
Christmas albums by American artists
Capitol Records Christmas albums
Country Christmas albums
Albums produced by Ken Nelson (United States record producer)